Emmanuel Wamala (born 15 December 1926) is a Ugandan cardinal of the Roman Catholic Church, and former Archbishop of Kampala from 1990 to 2006. He is currently serving as the Cardinal-Priest of Sant'Ugo, appointed in 1994.

Priesthood
Wamala was born in Kamaggwa parish of Lwaggulwe Masaka district, Uganda. He was ordained, on 21 December 1957, chapel of the Pontifical Collegio Urbaniano, Rome, by Pietro Sigismondi. In the same ceremony Stephen Fumio Hamao, future cardinal, was also ordained. He studied in Rome from 1957 to 1960 and had further studies in Uganda and United States, as well as pastoral ministry in the diocese of Masaka, from 1960 to 1981. He obtained a Bachelor of Theology. During this time he also served as inspector of diocesan schools and faculty member of the Minor Seminary of Bukalasa, chaplain and faculty member, and rector of University of Makerere. He served as vicar general of diocese of Masaka from 1974 to 1981. He was created Chaplain of His Holiness on 25 May 1977.

Cardinal

He was one of the cardinal electors who participated in the 2005 papal conclave that selected Pope Benedict XVI, but has lost the right to participate in any future conclave as a result of passing his eightieth birthday. He was succeeded in Kampala by Archbishop Cyprian Kizito Lwanga.

Wamala is a Patron of the African Prisons Project, an international non-governmental organisation with a mission to bring dignity and hope to men women and children in African prisons through health, education, justice and reintegration.
On 9 October 2021 Wamala attended the burial in Uganda of Msgr. Henry Kyabukasa, his 92 year old younger brother. Kyabukasa was a former Prelate of the Roman Catholic Diocese of Masaka and died at Villa-Maria Hospital in Kalungu district on 6 October 2021.

At the installation of the new Archbishop of Kampala Paul Ssemogerere on 25 January 2022, the congregation was informed that Wamala was unable to physically attend the ceremony as he was weak. Wamala's last public appearance was on 21 November 2021, at St Noa Mawaggali Cathedral in the Kiyinda-Mityana diocese, where he marked his 40th episcopal anniversary.

References

External links

 
 Emmanuel Cardinal Wamala's catholic-pages bio

1926 births
Living people
Ugandan cardinals
Cardinals created by Pope John Paul II
Pontifical Urban University alumni
Roman Catholic bishops of Kiyinda–Mityana
Roman Catholic archbishops of Kampala